= War in the Balkans =

War in the Balkans or Balkan(s) conflict may refer to:

- Yugoslav Wars, or any of the individual wars, stemming from the breakup of Yugoslavia in the 1990s
- Balkan Wars, the 1912–1913 wars in the Balkans

== See also ==
- Bulgarian-Serbian War (disambiguation)
